Microcotyle cepolae is a species of monogenean, parasitic on the gills of a marine fish. It belongs to the family Microcotylidae.

Systematics
Microcotyle cepolae was first described by Yamaguti in 1938. In 1972, Caballero y Caballero and Bravo-Hollis erected the genus Paramicrocotyle to describe Paramicrocotyle tampicensis and Paramicrocotyle atriobursata off Mexico, and placed within this genus sixteen species previously assigned to the genus Microcotyle  including M. cepolae. However, this species was returned to the genus Microcotyle by Mamaev in 1986.

Hosts and localities

The host-type is the bandfish  Cepola schlegelii (Cepolidae). The type-locality is off Japan.
Microcotyle cepolae was reported again from the type-host and locality.

References 

Microcotylidae
Animals described in 1937
Parasites of fish
Fauna of Japan